The Fizeș is a left tributary of the river Bârzava in Romania. It discharges into the Bârzava near Șoșdea.

Hydronymy

The Hungarian name means "willow-bed".

References

Rivers of Romania
Rivers of Caraș-Severin County